Olmeto is a commune in the Corse-du-Sud department of France on the island of Corsica.

Population

Archaeological sites
There are two archaeological sites in the commune: Cuntorba and Figa la Sarra.

See also
Tour de la Calanca
Tour de Micalona
Communes of the Corse-du-Sud department

References

Communes of Corse-du-Sud
Corse-du-Sud communes articles needing translation from French Wikipedia